Roger Birkett (born 4 April 1915, date of death unknown) was a Barbadian cricketer. He played in four first-class matches for the Barbados cricket team in 1940/41 and 1941/42.

See also
 List of Barbadian representative cricketers

References

External links
 

1915 births
Year of death missing
Barbadian cricketers
Barbados cricketers
People from Saint Joseph, Barbados